Dobbs Weir is both a weir in Hoddesdon, Hertfordshire and an area of Roydon, Essex in England on the River Lea. It is well known for angling, outdoor beauty and watersports. It is overlooked by the Fish and Eels pub.

Angling
The weir is a popular fishery. In 2003, the then record Chub weighing 8.8 pounds was caught by Tim Archer. The fishery is owned by the Lee Valley Regional Park Authority and is currently (2013) controlled by the partnership of Ware Angling Club and Hertford Angling Club forming a part of the Towpath Fishery. Day tickets are available on the bank. Season tickets are available by joining one of the controlling clubs.

Watersports
Dobbs Weir has had a long history serving the watersports community, as the sluice gates after the v-drops could be changed according to the flow of the water. Especially in winter months after heavy rain the weir could be changed into a formidable feature used for whitewater training or playboating.

Repair
Since August 2003, when British Waterways padlocked the sluice gates, watersports enthusiasts have been forced to go elsewhere, as the site has been deemed unsafe and requires approximately £25,000 for the weir to be repaired.

See also
 River Lea
 River Thames of which the River Lee is a tributary.
 Locks and Weirs on the River Lea

References

External links
 Lee Valley Caravan Park 
 Dobbs Weir information 

Weirs on the River Lea
Hoddesdon
Lee Valley Park